Thomas W. Travis (born December 21, 1953) is a retired lieutenant general of the United States Air Force who served as the twenty-first Surgeon General of the United States Air Force. Holding dual ratings as a Command Pilot and Flight Surgeon, Travis achieved the highest rank of any pilot-physician in the history of the program. After completing at total of over 39 years of active service in the Air Force, Travis retired in August 2015 to become the Senior Vice President of the Uniformed Services University of the Health Sciences.

References

1953 births
Living people
Recipients of the Air Force Distinguished Service Medal
Recipients of the Legion of Merit
Surgeons General of the United States Air Force